Executive Order 13581, titled Blocking Property of Transnational Criminal Organizations, was an executive order by United States president Barack Obama. The order authorized the U.S. Department of the Treasury to pursue sanctions against named transnational criminal organizations (TCOs).

Entities
These are the organizations the sanctions are imposed against:
 The Brothers Circle
 Camorra
 Yakuza
 Los Zetas

References

Executive orders of Barack Obama